The Quantum GP700 is a custom track-only open-wheel sports car, designed, developed and built by Australian Jeff David, produced between 2016 and 2019. The car was manufactured and designed through a joint collaboration with a number of institutes and companies, including Keetch3D, Motec, Autronic, Beninca Motors, Holinger Engineering, University of Melbourne Mechanical Engineering, RMIT Mechanical Engineering, Deakin University Mechanical Engineering, and Western Smash repairs. It boasts a 1:1 power-to-weight ratio, having an engine which produces , and weighing only .

References

Cars of England
Rear mid-engine, rear-wheel-drive vehicles
Roadsters
Cars introduced in 2016
2010s cars
Sports cars